John Watkins (1823–1874) was an English portrait photographer.    John and his brother Octavius Charles Watkins (1836–1882) often worked together. They made studio portraits of artists and culturally influential people in the years between 1840 and 1875.  
Among their sitters were many notables of the Victorian era, including Charles Dickens, the Prince of Wales, John Stuart Mill, Thomas Carlyle, Charles Kingsley, Carlo Marochetti, and many others.

Notes

1823 births
1874 deaths
British portrait photographers
19th-century English photographers